Jézéquel is a surname of Breton origin and may refer to:

 Jean-Marc Jézéquel (born 1964), French computer scientist,
 Julie Jézéquel (born 1964), French actress and writer,
 Françoise Jézéquel (born 1970), French footballer.

Breton-language surnames